HB Studios Multimedia Limited is a Canadian video game developer based in Lunenburg, Nova Scotia. It is best known for its rugby and cricket games.

History
HB Studios was founded in early July 2000 by Jeremy Wellard in Lunenburg, Nova Scotia. The company started with nine employees and developed Cricket 2002 for Electronic Arts. The studio entered a multi-project deal with EA Canada in 2004 to continue developing sports games for the EA Sports label, including further games in the Rugby and Cricket series, FIFA Street 2 for the PlayStation Portable as well as co-development on Madden 07 for the Wii. This exclusivity deal ended in 2007.

In 2008, HB Studios opened a second studio in Halifax, Nova Scotia. At the time, the company had 130 employees. The Halifax studio was closed at the end of July 2012 with all development moved to the headquarters in Lunenberg. The last games developed by the satellite studio were NBA Baller Beats for Xbox 360 and Medal Bound for iOS. A publishing label, HB Arcade, was formed in 2009 with the goal of self-publishing downloadable titles on WiiWare, PlayStation Network, and Xbox Live Arcade. Games released under this label included HB Arcade Cards and HB Arcade Disc Golf, both for WiiWare, as well as Jam Space for DSiWare.

Wellard stepped down as president of the company in February 2015 and was to be replaced by Alan Bunker, the chief operating officer. In August 2018, 2K Sports took over the publishing of The Golf Club 2019 featuring PGA Tour which was released on August 28, 2018. Bunker departed the company in November 2019, with James Seaboyer taking over as chief executive officer. Dave McFarland, previously the technical director, became the chief technology officer, while Craig Heffler remained the chief financial officer.

HB Studios was acquired by 2K in March 2021 and will continue to work on PGA Tour games. 2K also secured a long-term contract with Tiger Woods to use his likeness for these games as well as to serve as executive producer and consultant for the series.

Games developed

References

External links
 

2000 establishments in Nova Scotia
2021 mergers and acquisitions
2K (company)
Canadian companies established in 2000
Canadian subsidiaries of foreign companies
Companies based in Nova Scotia
Lunenburg County, Nova Scotia
Take-Two Interactive divisions and subsidiaries
Video game companies established in 2000
Video game companies of Canada
Video game development companies